Savriqul Muhammadroziqi known professionally as Abdu Rozik (born 23 September, 2003) is a Tajikistani singer. In 2022, Rozik participated in Colors TV's reality show Bigg Boss 16 where he finished at 11th place.

Early Life
Rozik was born as Savriqul Muhammadroziqi to Savriqul Muhammad and Rooh Afza in a Muslim family on 23 September 2003 in Gizhdarva,Panjakent in Tajikistan. His parents worked as gardeners. He has two brothers and two sisters.

As a child, Rozik was diagnosed with rickets, a growth hormone deficiency which could be cured with appropriate medical treatment. However, his family could not provide him with the treatment as their financial condition was poor. As a result, his body growth was stunted.

Career
At a very young age, Rozik started singing on the streets of Gizhdarva. In 2019 while singing, he was supported by Tajikistani rapper-blogger Baron (Behruz) who convinced Rozik's father to make a career on singing. After getting permission, he shifted to Dubai along with Baron. Initially, Baron helped him financially.

Rozik sang various Tajikistani song like Ohi Dili Zor (2019), Chaki Chaki Boron (2020) and Modar (2021). In 2021, he uploaded a video of him singing the Hindi song Enna Sona by Arijit Singh. In 2022, he was invited to attend the 22nd IIFA Awards ceremony, which was held in Abu Dhabi, United Arab Emirates where he sang the Hindi song "Ek Ladki Ko Dekha Toh Aisa Laga" from the 1994 film 1942: A Love Story, dedicating the song to Salman Khan.

In 2021, he challenged Russian MMA fighter Hasbulla, but the Russian Dwarf Athletic Association (RDAA) did not approve, calling it unethical.

In October 2022, he participated in Bigg Boss before which he was roped in to act in Salman Khan starrer movie Kisi Ka Bhai Kisi Ki Jaan.

Filmography

Films

Television

References

External links 

 

Tajikistani boxers
Tajikistani singers

2003 births
Living people